Holy Cross College may refer to:

Asia and Oceania
 Holy Cross College (Dhaka), Bangladesh
 Holy Cross College (Kalutara), Sri Lanka
 Holy Cross College (Gampaha), Sri Lanka
 Holy Cross College (New Zealand)
 Holy Cross College Ryde, a high school in Sydney, Australia
 Holy Cross College of Sasa, Davao City, Philippines
 Holy Cross of Davao College, Philippines
 Holy Cross College of Calinan, Philippines

India
 Holy Cross College, Agartala, in Tripura
 Holy Cross College, Nagercoil, in Nagercoil, Tamil Nadu
 Holy Cross College, Tiruchirapalli

Ireland
 Holy Cross College (Dublin), Ireland

United Kingdom
 Holy Cross College (UK), in Bury, England
 Holy Cross College, Strabane, Northern Ireland

United States
 Holy Cross College (Indiana), Notre Dame, Indiana
 College of the Holy Cross, Worcester, Massachusetts
 Our Lady of Holy Cross College, New Orleans, Louisiana

West Indies
 Holy Cross College (Trinidad), in Arima, Trinidad and Tobago

See also
 Hellenic College Holy Cross Greek Orthodox School of Theology, Brookline, Massachusetts
 Holy Cross (disambiguation)
 Holy Cross School (disambiguation)
 Holy Cross University (disambiguation)
 HCC (disambiguation)
 Pontifical University of the Holy Cross, Rome